On the Brink of Paradise (/ transl: On the Ruins of Paradise) is a 1920 German 90-minute film directed by Josef Stein and featuring Carl de Vogt in the title role of Kara Ben Nemsi. Béla Lugosi was thought to have appeared in a supporting uncredited role, but this is disputed. 

The film was an adaptation of part of the 1892 Karl May novel Von Bagdad nach Stambul and is now considered to be lost. This film was followed by a sequel Caravan of Death (1920), which went on to adapt the latter part of the same Karl May novel (Bela Lugosi did co-star in the sequel, playing a shiek).

Plot
Kara ben Nemsi and his servant Halef Omar come across a group of Persians headed to Baghdad, led by Prince Hassan Ardžir-Mírza. The Persians are attacked by their enemies, the Kurds. Prince Hassan discovers there is a traitor among his people. Kara ben Nemsi offers to help guard the caravan on its journey to Baghdad.

Cast
 Carl de Vogt as Kara Ben Nemsi / Abdul Malik
 Meinhart Maur as Hadschi Halef Omar / Saduk
 Gustav Kirchberg as Prince Hassan Ardzir-Mirza / Hussein Mohammed
 Dora Gerson as Dzana Ardschir Mirza
 Cläre Lotto as Benda Ardschir Mirza
 Tronier Funder as Selim Aga
 Erwin Baron as Omram / Jesid Abu Sufian
 Beate Herwigh as Hafsa
 Fred Berger as Obeidullah
 Anna von Palen as Marah Durimeh
 Curt Bry as Piano
 Helga Hall
 Béla Lugosi? (his appearance in the film is unconfirmed/ disputed)

See also
 Karl May film adaptations
 Béla Lugosi filmography

References

External links

1920 films
1920 adventure films
1920 lost films
German adventure films
German silent feature films
German black-and-white films
Films of the Weimar Republic
Films based on the Orient Cycle
Films set in the 19th century
Lost German films
Lost adventure films
Silent adventure films
1920s German films